Lawrence Revere (born Griffith K. Owens; November 5, 1915 – April 23, 1977) was an author, casino pit boss, and professional blackjack player best known for his book Playing Blackjack as a Business. Revere played under multiple aliases, including Leonard "Speck" Parsons and Paul Mann.

Education and personal life 
Revere had a degree in mathematics from the University of Nebraska.

He died of cancer on April 23, 1977.

Card counting 

Revere promoted the following card counting strategies developed with Julian Braun, which were detailed in Playing Blackjack as a Business:

The Revere Point Count
The Revere Five Count Strategy
The Reverse Plus-Minus Strategy
The Ten Count Strategy

Revere Point Count was highly popular in the early days of counting and is still considered a benchmark strategy. His book only gave the single-deck version. He sold the multi-deck version and it is still sold decades later by relatives. He also sold high-level strategies referred to as Revere Advanced Point Count (RAPC.) These are now generally considered obsolete due to unnecessary complexity – although they are still valid and in use today.

Revere was a controversial figure as he worked both sides of the game at once (casino and player), advising both sides. But he was also known as a master of avoiding detection by casinos, and as an early proponent of composition-dependent strategy and floating advantage.  And he trained many of the early counters, some of whom use his strategies to this day.

References

External links
Official site - No longer available

1915 births
1977 deaths
University of Nebraska–Lincoln alumni
American gambling writers
American male non-fiction writers
American blackjack players
20th-century American male writers